Buner District is a district in Malakand Division of Khyber Pakhtunkhwa province in Pakistan. Before becoming a district in 1991, it was a tehsil within Swat District.

History 

The Buner Valley lies between Swabi on the South and Swat on the North. It is a mountain valley, dotted with villages and divided into four sub-divisions.  The Mora Hills and the Ilam range divide it from the Swat Valley, the Sinawar range from Yusafzai, the Guru mountains from the Mardan Valley, and the Duma range from the Puran Valley.

During the 1580s, many Yusufzais and Mandanrs rebelled against the Mughal Empire. In late 1585, Mughal Emperor Akbar sent military forces under Zain Khan Koka and Birbal to crush the rebellion. In February 1586, about 8,000 Mughal soldiers, including Birbal, were killed near the Karakar Pass by the Yusufzai lashkar, led by Kalu Khan. This was the greatest disaster faced by the Mughal Army during Akbar's reign.

During the 19th century, the inhabitants of Buner rose twice against the British Raj.

In April 2009, the Tehrik-i-Taliban Pakistan seized control of Buner, after a brief battle with local residents.  Strict rules were reportedly being enforced, including the elimination of video stores, bans on cutting beards, and the prevention of women from appearing in many public places. On 29 April the government responded to the Taliban by sending the army to the region and dropping parachutists by helicopter. By the end of May 2009, almost all of Buner was cleared of the Taliban. 
Elum Ghar

Demographics 
At the time of the 2017 census the district had a population of 895,460, of which 445,872 were males and 449,555 females. The entire population was rural. The literacy rate was 46.84% - the male literacy rate was 65.10% while the female literacy rate was 29.40%. 1,402 people in the district were from religious minorities. Pashto was the predominant language, spoken by 97.56% of the population.

Administration

Buner Tehsils
Buner District is currently subdivided into 6 Tehsils.

 Daggar
 Gagra
 Khudu Khel
 Mandanr
 Chagharzai
 Gadezai/Salarzai

National assembly
This district is represented by one elected MNA (Member of National Assembly) in Pakistan National Assembly. Its constituency is NA-28.

Provincial assembly
The district has three constituencies in the Provincial Assembly of Khyber Pakhtunkhwa and one in the National Assembly of Pakistan.

Educational establishments
 University of Buner
 Government College Daggar, Buner
 Government Girls Degree College Daggar
 Government Degree College Jowar, Buner

Largest villages  
 Torwarsak is the most populated Town in Buner which had population about 35,165 in 2018.
 Totalai is the 2nd populated town with population about 24,562 in 2018. 
 Rega is on 3rd populated town with population about 23,726 in 2018. 
 Ellai is 4th with population about 23,678 in 2018.

Sadaat villages 
 Takhtaband
 Nawagai
 Sunigram
 Malka
 Daggar kalay
 Bajkata, pakistan Daggar 
 بامپوخہ

See also

 Rustam, Mardan
 Mardan

References

 
Districts of Khyber Pakhtunkhwa